Hippodamia notata is a species of ladybird belonging to the family Coccinellidae.

Varieties
 Hippodamia notata var. c-nigrum Della Beffa
 Hippodamia notata var. elongata Weise
 Hippodamia notata var. quinquesignata Friv.

Description
Adults have domed backs, mainly oval, with short legs and antennae. Pronotum is predominantly black, with white markings on the front edge. This species exhibits a remarkable variability of elytral color patterns. Elytra may be yellow-orange to red and wear large black spots. The legs are black, partially brown, the antennae are also brown. The larvae are slightly flattened and covered with miniature spines.

Distribution
This species is present in most of Europe, in the East Palearctic ecozone and in the Near East. It mainly inhabits forest edges and clearings.

Biology
Like most ladybugs, this species feeds on the larvae and adults of aphids.

Gallery

Bibliography
 Georg Möller, Reiner Grube, Ekkehard Wachmann: Der Fauna Käferführer I - Käfer im und am Wald Fauna-Verlag, Nottuln 2006, .

References

External links
  Variability of elytral color patterns in ladybirds – kerbtier.de

Coccinellidae
Taxa named by Johann Nepomuk von Laicharting
Beetles described in 1781